Pleyte may refer to:

 Cornelis Marinus Pleyte (1863–1917), Dutch museum curator; son of Willem Pleyte
 Thomas Bastiaan Pleyte (1864–1926), Dutch politician
 Willem Pleyte (1836–1903), Dutch Egyptologist and museum director; father of Cornelis Marinus Pleyte